Happy Returns is a Los Angeles-based software and :reverse logistics company that works with online merchants to handle product returns. Purchased items can be returned in person without boxes or labels at third-party locations known as "Return Bars" including :FedEx, Cost Plus World Market, and Paper Source stores, with specific locations searchable on Happy Returns’ website. Consumers can receive their refunds without packaging items, printing and affixing labels, or waiting for mailed packages to reach their destination.

The company facilitates returns for many brands, including Levi's, Revolve, :Rothy%27s, :Everlane,  Steve Madden, :Gymshark. Amazon later developed a similar program in conjunction with :Kohl’s stores to accommodate its shoppers.

Happy Returns aggregates and ships returns from its return locations to warehouse hubs, where returns are sorted, processed, and dispositioned, and then bulk shipped back to merchant warehouses. Waste is reduced because shoppers do not need to use a new box to ship out returns.

History
David Sobie and Mark Geller co-founded Happy Returns in July 2015. The two met at NordstromRack.com/HauteLook, where they created and launched a similar program enabling shoppers to return online purchases to physical stores. Happy Returns opened its first Return Bar location in April 2016.

In June 2021, Happy Returns was acquired by PayPal.

References

External links
 Official website

American companies established in 2015
Retail companies established in 2015
Internet properties established in 2015
Software companies based in California
Companies based in Los Angeles
2021 mergers and acquisitions
PayPal
Defunct software companies of the United States